Filmco was an Australian investment company used by producers to raise funds to invest in Australian movies. It flourished during the 10BA era.

The company was formed in 1980 by Peter Fox and Bob Sanders (who merged his Pact Productions into the company). They were joined by John Fitzgerald, a former lawyer at the South Australian Film Corporation, who acted as executive producer. David Stratton wrote that "the Filmco slate consisted of some of the most dismal films ever produced in Australia" and represented "a scandalous waste of money".

Peter Fox was killed in a car accident in 1982.

Select Credits
Turkey Shoot (1982)
Early Frost (1982)
A Dangerous Summer (1982)
The Dark Room (1982)
Midnite Spares (1982)
Far East (1982)
For the Term of His Natural Life (1983) (mini series)
Double Deal (1983)
'Undercover (1983)

References

External links
Filmco at IMDb
Filmco at Screen Australia

Film production companies of Australia